The blazed Luzon shrew rat (Chrotomys silaceus) is a species of rodent in the family Muridae, endemic to the Philippines.

Distribution and habitat
The species occurs in the Central Cordillera in northern Luzon at elevations of 1,800 - 2,500 m, where it is known only from four disparate localities. It frequents dense vegetation in montane and mossy forests and does not make use of severely disturbed habitat, although it has been reported from mosaic vegetation created by landslides.

References

Rats of Asia
Endemic fauna of the Philippines
Fauna of Luzon
Rodents of the Philippines
Mammals described in 1895
Taxa named by Oldfield Thomas
Chrotomys
Taxonomy articles created by Polbot